Nicole Walraven (born 12 December 1994) is a South African field hockey player for the South African national team.

She participated at the 2018 Women's Hockey World Cup.

References

External links

1994 births
Living people
South African female field hockey players
Female field hockey defenders
Field hockey players at the 2018 Commonwealth Games
Commonwealth Games competitors for South Africa
Field hockey players at the 2020 Summer Olympics
Olympic field hockey players of South Africa